In medieval castles the chemise (French: "shirt") was typically a low wall encircling the keep, protecting the base of the tower. Alternative terms, more commonly used in English, are mantlet wall or apron wall.

In some cases, the keep could be entered only from the chemise (i.e. at the first floor level). Numerous examples exist of highly varied form, including the heavily fortified chemise of Château de Vincennes, or the more modest example at Provins, both in France. Some chemises are suggested to have been developed from earlier motte and bailey defences, though they may not usually be referred to as chemise.

In later fortification, a chemise is a wall lined with a bastion, or any other bulwark of earth, for greater support and strength.

References

Note 
The German Wikipedia entry "Mantelmauer" links to this entry. This is not accurate, since the German "Mantelmauer" was renowned for being particularly high rather than the English / French "chemise" which is described here as a "low wall". An example is Alzenau Castle in Germany, where the "Mantelmauer" is 14 metres (approx. 46 feet) high.

Bibliography 

Castle architecture